The Metropolitan Borough of Sefton is a metropolitan borough of Merseyside, England. It was formed on 1 April 1974, by the amalgamation of the county boroughs of Bootle and Southport, the municipal borough of Crosby, the urban districts of Formby and Litherland, and part of West Lancashire Rural District. It consists of a coastal strip of land on the Irish Sea which extends from Southport in the north to Bootle in the south, and an inland part to Maghull in the south-east, bounded by the city of Liverpool to the south, the Metropolitan Borough of Knowsley to the south-east, and West Lancashire to the east.

It is named after Sefton, near Maghull. When the borough was created, a name was sought that would not unduly identify the borough with any of its constituent parts, particularly the former county boroughs of Bootle and Southport. The area had strong links with both the Earl of Sefton and the Earl of Derby, resident of Knowsley Hall, and the adjacent borough was subsequently named Knowsley. A Sefton Rural District covering some of the villages in the district existed from 1894 to 1932.

Governance

Liverpool City Region Combined Authority
The Metropolitan Borough of Sefton is one of the six constituent local government districts of the Liverpool City Region. Since 1 April 2014, some of the borough's responsibilities have been pooled with neighbouring authorities within the metropolitan area and subsumed into the Liverpool City Region Combined Authority.

The combined authority has effectively become the top-tier administrative body for the local governance of the city region and the leader of Sefton Council, along with the five other leaders from neighbouring local government districts, take strategic decisions over economic development, transport, employment and skills, tourism, culture, housing and physical infrastructure.

In July 2015, negotiations took place between the UK national government and the combined authority over a possible devolution deal to confer greater powers on the region, including whether to introduce an elected 'Metro Mayor' to oversee the entire metropolitan area.

Historic controversy
The existence of Sefton has been an ongoing local controversy, especially in Southport, where local Members of Parliament (MPs) and councillors have campaigned for separation from Bootle and the possible inclusion of the town as a district in the non-metropolitan county of Lancashire. It was highlighted after the 2012 local government election that different regions in Sefton had vastly different socio-economic backgrounds and needs. There are high levels of poverty around the Bootle area and central Southport.

Sefton Council composition
The council has 66 councillors, three for each of the borough's 22 wards:
Ainsdale
Birkdale Blundellsands
Cambridge Church
Derby Dukes
Ford
Harington
Kew
Linacre Litherland
Manor Meols Molyneux
Netherton and Orrell Norwood
Park
Ravenmeols
St. Oswald Sudell
Victoria

, the council is composed of 46 Labour councillors, 8 for The Liberal Democrat and Progressive Alliance Group, 5 Conservatives, and 7 Independents. 

https://www.sefton.gov.uk/your-council/councillors-meetings-decisions/

Economy

The borough has a strong income from tourism, most of whom visit the Aintree Grand National, the most valuable horse race in Europe, Anthony Gormley's Another Place at Crosby Beach and Southport.  Birkdale is also home to the Royal Birkdale Golf Club which has played host to the Open Championship, Ryder Cup, Walker Cup and Curtis Cup.

This is a chart of trend of regional gross value added of Sefton at current basic prices published (pp. 240–53) by Office for National Statistics with figures in millions of British Pounds Sterling.

 Components may not sum to totals due to rounding
 includes hunting and forestry
 includes energy and construction
 includes financial intermediation services indirectly measured

Demographics

Ethnicity

Main Languages
At the 2011 census, there were 265,010 usual residents of Sefton aged 3 or over whose main language was declared. The 10 most common main languages were as follows:
 English 259,820 (98.04%)
 Polish 1,579 (0.62%)
 Chinese 415 (0.16%)
 Portuguese 318 (0.12%)
 Latvian 252 (0.10%)
 Spanish 201 (0.08%)
 Lithuania 190 (0.07%)
 Arabic 158 (0.06%)
 Bengali (with Sylheti and Chittagonian) 142 (0.05%)
 Turkish 141 (0.05%)
1,794 (0.68%) usual residents over the age of 3 had a different main language to the above languages.

Towns and villages in Sefton
Ainsdale, Aintree
Birkdale, Blowick, Blundellsands, Bootle
Churchtown, Crosby, Crossens
Ford, Formby
Hightown, Hillside
Ince Blundell
Kennessee Green
Litherland, Little Altcar, Little Crosby, Lunt, Lydiate
Maghull, Marshside, Melling
Netherton
Orrell
Seaforth, Sefton, Southport
Thornton
Waterloo, Woodvale

Parliamentary constituencies

Bootle
Sefton Central
Southport

Sister cities
Sefton is twinned with:

Freedom of the Borough
The following people, military units and Organisations and Groups have received the Freedom of the Borough of Sefton.

Individuals
 Donald "Ginger" McCain: 22 June 2004
 James Lee Duncan Carragher: 23 January 2006
 Alex Greenwood: Date in 2023 to be confirmed.

Military units
 238 (Sefton) Squadron 156 Regiment Royal Corps of Transport: 6 March 1982
 238 (Sefton) Squadron 156 (North-West) Transport Regiment Royal Logistic Corps (Volunteers): 13 April 2002
 RAF Woodvale: 3 July 2011
The Duke of Lancasters Regiment - 21 June 2017 
 , RN: 13 April 2023.
 
---Organisations---

Alder Hey Childrens NHS Foundation Trust

Liverpool University Hospitals NHS Foundation Trust

Mersey Care NHS Foundation Trust

Southport and Ormskirk Hospital NHS Trust 

All on 26 January 2023 (17)

See also
 Sefton Coast – An SSSI covering much of the borough's coastline
 St Helen's Church, Sefton
 Southport Flower Show – The UK's largest independent flower show
 List of schools in Sefton

References

17. https://www.sefton.gov.uk/your-council/the-mayor/honorary-freedom-of-the-borough/

External links
Sefton Council
Vision of Britain

 
Metropolitan boroughs of Merseyside
Liverpool City Region
 
NUTS 3 statistical regions of the United Kingdom